Jimmy Eat World is an American rock band. It is also the name of three albums released by the band:

Jimmy Eat World (1994 album)
Bleed American, which was later re-titled Jimmy Eat World
Jimmy Eat World (EP)

Jimmy Eat World